Ruan de Vries (born 1 February 1986) is a hurdler from South Africa. In 2010 he competed at the 2010 African Championships in Nairobi and won the bronze medal in the 110-metre hurdles with a time of 13.98 seconds.

Education
He studied at the University of Pretoria.

Competition record

References

South African male hurdlers
Afrikaner people
South African people of Dutch descent
1986 births
Living people
University of Pretoria alumni
Athletes (track and field) at the 2006 Commonwealth Games
Commonwealth Games competitors for South Africa
Athletes (track and field) at the 2007 All-Africa Games
African Games competitors for South Africa